1,1,1-Trifluoroacetylacetone is the organofluorine compound with the formula CFC(O)CHC(O)CH. It is a colorless liquid. Like other 1,3-diketones, it is used as a precursor to heterocycles, e.g. pyrazoles, and metal chelates. It is prepared by condensation of esters of trifluoroacetic acid with acetone.

According to an analysis by proton NMR spectroscopy, the compound exists predominantly (97% at 33 °C, neat) as the enol.  For comparison under the same conditions, the percent enol for acetylacetone and hexafluoroacetylacetone are 85 and 100%, respectively.

References

Chelating agents
Diketones
Trifluoromethyl compounds
3-Hydroxypropenals